Hesperocallis is a genus of flowering plants that includes a single species, Hesperocallis undulata, known as the desert lily or ajo lily.

It is found in the desert areas of southwestern North America, in Northwestern Mexico, California, and Arizona.  The plant grows in Mojave Desert and Sonoran Desert habitats.

Taxonomy
In the APG III system, adopted here, Hesperocallis is placed in the family Asparagaceae, subfamily Agavoideae, since recent molecular systematic studies (Pires et al. 2004) have confirmed a close relationship with Agave. Other classifications have included the species in its own family, Hemerocallidaceae, or placed it in the Hostaceae (Funkiaceae); both families are submerged into the Agavoideae in the APG III system. As with many of the 'lilioid monocots', prior to the use of molecular evidence in classification, it was placed in the Liliaceae.

Uses
The bulbs of the desert lily are eaten by native peoples.

References

Pires, J. C., I. J. Maureira, J. P. Rebman, G. A. Salazar, L. I. Cabrera, M. F. Fay, and M. W. Chase. 2004. Molecular data confirm the phylogenetic placement of the enigmatic Hesperocallis (Hesperocallidaceae) with Agave. Madroño 51: 307–311.
 NCBI Taxonomy Browser

External links
 CalFlora Database: Hesperocallis undulata
 genus and USDA Plants Profile of Hesperocallis undulata
 Hesperocallis in the Flora of North America (treated as a member of the family Liliaceae); Distribution Map
 Hesperocallis undulata pictures
BLM Desert Lily Preserve photo album
 links at CSDL, Texas

Agavoideae
Monotypic Asparagaceae genera
North American desert flora
Flora of the California desert regions
Flora of Arizona
Flora of Northwestern Mexico
Flora of the Sonoran Deserts
Natural history of the Mojave Desert
Plants used in Native American cuisine
Asparagaceae genera
Flora without expected TNC conservation status